Aleksandr Viktorovich Ignatenko (born 12 December 1951 in Voroshilovgrad) is a Ukrainian-born Russian professional football coach and a former player.

As a player, he made his debut in the Soviet Top League in 1970 for Zarya Voroshilovgrad.

Honours
 Soviet Top League champion: 1972.
 Russian Second Division Zone Ural/Povolzhye best manager: 2004, 2005.

References

1951 births
Living people
Footballers from Luhansk
Soviet footballers
Soviet Top League players
FC Zorya Luhansk players
PFC CSKA Moscow players
Russian football managers
FC Tyumen managers
FC Moscow managers
FC Baltika Kaliningrad managers
FC Metallurg Lipetsk players
Russian Premier League managers
FC Metallurg Lipetsk managers
FC Volgar Astrakhan managers
FC Sodovik Sterlitamak managers
Association football midfielders
FC Sever Murmansk players